Luis Felipe Restrepo (born 1959), known commonly as L. Felipe Restrepo, is a United States circuit judge of the United States Court of Appeals for the Third Circuit and former United States district judge of the United States District Court for the Eastern District of Pennsylvania. He is a member of the United States Sentencing Commission.

Biography

Restrepo was born in Medellín, Colombia, and was raised in northern Virginia. He was sworn in as a United States Citizen on September 7, 1993. He received his Bachelor of Arts degree in 1981 from the University of Pennsylvania. He received his Juris Doctor in 1986 from Tulane Law School. Restrepo began his legal career as a law clerk at the American Civil Liberties Union National Prison Project. From 1987 to 1990, he served as an Assistant Defender with the Defender Association of Philadelphia. He served as an Assistant Federal Defender in the Eastern District of Pennsylvania from 1990 to 1993. He was a partner at the law firm of Krasner & Restrepo from 1993 to 2006. From 2006 to 2013, he served as a United States magistrate judge of the Eastern District of Pennsylvania where he presided over a variety of criminal and civil matters.c He has served in a variety of teaching positions; since 1993 he has served as an Adjunct Professor teaching Trial Advocacy at Temple University Beasley School of Law. From 1997 to 2009 he served as an Adjunct Professor teaching Trial Advocacy at University of Pennsylvania Law School and in the summer of 1992 he served as an Adjunct Professor teaching a course in Criminal Justice at Peirce College.

Federal judicial service

District court service 

On November 27, 2012, President Barack Obama nominated Restrepo to serve as a United States district judge of the United States District Court for the Eastern District of Pennsylvania, to the seat vacated by Judge Anita B. Brody, who assumed senior status on June 8, 2009. On January 2, 2013, his nomination was returned to the President, due to the sine die adjournment of the Senate. On January 3, 2013, Obama renominated Restrepo to the same office. The Senate confirmed his nomination on June 17, 2013, by a voice vote. He received his commission on June 19, 2013. His service as a district court judge was terminated on January 13, 2016, when he was elevated to the United States Court of Appeals for the Third Circuit.

Court of appeals service 

On November 12, 2014, President Obama nominated Restrepo to serve as a United States Circuit Judge of the United States Court of Appeals for the Third Circuit, to the seat vacated by Anthony Joseph Scirica who assumed senior status on July 1, 2013. On December 16, 2014, his nomination was returned to the President due to the sine die adjournment of the Senate. On January 7, 2015, President Obama renominated him to the same position. He received a hearing before the Senate Judiciary Committee  on June 10, 2015. On July 9, 2015, his nomination was reported out of committee by a voice vote. On January 11, 2016, the United States Senate confirmed him by a 82–6 vote. Judge Restrepo was President Obama's last appellate court judge to be confirmed by the Senate. He received his commission on January 13, 2016.

United States Sentencing Commission

Intent to nominate under Trump 

On March 1, 2018, President Donald Trump nominated Restrepo to serve as Commissioner of the United States Sentencing Commission, a seven-member independent body that sets federal sentencing guidelines. Restrepo's nomination was sent to the United States Senate. On January 3, 2019, his nomination was returned to the President under Rule XXXI, Paragraph 6 of the United States Senate. On August 12, 2020, President Donald Trump announced his intent to renominate Restrepo to serve as a Commissioner of the United States Sentencing Commission.

Nomination under Biden 

On May 11, 2022, President Joe Biden announced his intent to nominate Restrepo to serve as a member of the United States Sentencing Commission. On May 12, 2022, his nomination was sent to the Senate, he has been nominated to fill the position left vacant by Judge Ketanji Brown Jackson, whose term expired. On June 8, 2022, a hearing on his nomination was held before the Senate Judiciary Committee. On July 21, 2022, his nomination was reported out of committee by a voice vote, with 6 Republican senators voted “no” on record. On August 4, 2022, the United States Senate confirmed his nomination by a voice vote.

See also 
List of Hispanic/Latino American jurists
List of first minority male lawyers and judges in Pennsylvania

References

External links

1959 births
Living people
21st-century American judges
American politicians of Colombian descent
Colombian emigrants to the United States
Hispanic and Latino American judges
Judges of the United States District Court for the Eastern District of Pennsylvania
Judges of the United States Court of Appeals for the Third Circuit
Lawyers from Philadelphia
Members of the United States Sentencing Commission
People from Medellín
People from Virginia
Public defenders
Tulane University Law School alumni
United States district court judges appointed by Barack Obama
United States court of appeals judges appointed by Barack Obama
United States magistrate judges
University of Pennsylvania alumni
University of Pennsylvania Law School faculty